The 1909 International Cross Country Championships was held in Derby, England, at the Derby Racecourse on 20 March 1909.  A report on the event was given in the Glasgow Herald.

Complete results, medallists, 
 and the results of British athletes were published.

Medallists

Individual Race Results

Men's (10 mi / 16.1 km)

Team Results

Men's

Participation
An unofficial count yields the participation of 51 athletes from 5 countries.

 (12)
 (9)
 (10)
 (10)
 (10)

See also
 1909 in athletics (track and field)

References

International Cross Country Championships
International Cross Country Championships
Cross
International Cross Country Championships
International Cross Country Championships